Tina Louise Germaine (born 1971) is an English actress and model best known for her appearance as usherette Sylvia Berry in the 1993 Dennis Potter serial Lipstick on Your Collar. She played chambermaid Kate Hargreaves in the six-part 1994 comedy The House of Windsor.

Life and career
Germaine's father, David, left her mother, Yvonne, and two elder brothers, Ian and Mark, before she was born. On 14 February 1994, she married hairdresser Lea Carter.

Germaine is said to have inspired one of Dennis Potter's final scripts, Karaoke, but her pregnancy prevented being cast in the production.

References

External links

1971 births
Living people
English film actresses
English female models
English television actresses
People from Margate
Actresses from Kent
20th-century English actresses